Jimmie M. Edwards was a circuit judge for the 22nd Judicial Circuit, serving St. Louis. He was appointed to the court in April 1992. Edwards left the bench in October 2017 due to his appointment as Director of the Public Safety Department - City of St. Louis by Mayor Lyda Krewson.

Education
Edwards received his undergraduate degree in 1978 and his J.D. in 1982, both from St. Louis University.

Career
1992–2017: 22nd Circuit Court
1989–1992: Attorney, Southwestern Bell Telephone Company
1984–1989: General counsel, Sabreliner Corporation
1981–1984: Attorney in private practice

Controversy
Edwards was at the center of a controversy over public statements made following the deaths of 13 minors during the Summer of 2019 as a result of violent crime. During an interview with Saint Louis public radio, Edwards stated that not all the minors who have died were "innocent bystanders", asserting that many of them were involved in criminal activities. Edwards reiterated his comments at an October 11 meeting of the STL Public Safety Committee. Edwards statements were condemned in a joint resolution by thirteen Saint Louis activist organizations, including Action St. Louis, ArchCity Defenders, ACLU-Missouri, Metropolitan Congregations United, the Deaconess Foundation and the Organization for Black Struggle, writing "This kind of demonization of our children is shocking and unacceptable. It builds on racist, dehumanizing tropes about Black children and distracts from the public policies that continue to deepen poverty and despair instead of investing resources to create safety and opportunity. Public Safety Director Edwards is the highest-ranking law enforcement official in the City of St. Louis. If this is what he thinks of children dying in the streets, it is no wonder that the response from public safety officials continues to focus on police, surveillance, and incarceration."

Awards and Associations
2011: Hero of the Year, People Magazine
2010: Raymond Pace Alexander Award for Outstanding Judicial Advocacy and Humanity, National Bar Association
Mentor of the Year, 100 Black Men
Annie Malone Children and Family Advocacy Award
Teacher of the Year, Saint Louis University
Missouri Bar Association
Mound City Bar Association
National Bar Association
Bar Association of Metropolitan St. Louis
Habitat for Humanity Saint Louis
Antioch Baptist Church

References

1955 births
Living people
Missouri state court judges
Lawyers from St. Louis
Missouri Democrats